The Kilimanjaro mouse shrew (Myosorex zinki) is a species of mammal in the family Soricidae endemic to Kilimanjaro Region of Tanzania. Its natural habitats are subtropical or tropical moist montane forests and swamps.

References

Myosorex
Mammals of Tanzania
Endemic fauna of Tanzania
Taxonomy articles created by Polbot